Pero mizon is a species of geometrid moth in the family Geometridae. It is found in North America.

The MONA or Hodges number for Pero mizon is 6757.

References

Further reading

External links

 

Azelinini
Articles created by Qbugbot
Moths described in 1955